Urfé or Urfe may refer to:

People
François-Saturnin Lascaris d'Urfé (1641–1701), French Sulpician priest in Baie-d'Urfé, Quebec, Canada
Honoré d'Urfé (1568–1625), French novelist
José Urfé (1879–1957), Cuban clarinetist and composer

Other uses
Urfe (album) by British industrial black metal band The Axis of Perdition. 
Baie-D'Urfé, Quebec, Canada
Nicholas Urfe, the main character in the novel The Magus

See also
Urfa (disambiguation)